Grangetown is a suburb of Sunderland in Tyne and Wear, England. It is situated two miles south of Sunderland City Centre and two miles north of Ryhope. Grangetown was previously known for heavy traffic congestion, as it contained the intersection of the original route of the A1018 road (which was the original route of the A19 and the main road into Sunderland from the south) and the inner and outer ring roads.  Since the opening of the new Southern Radial Route in mid-2008, traffic has become less of an issue in the area. Grangetown is home to many shops and is a popular shopping place for locals. It contains Grangetown Primary School and Southmoor Academy. The borders of Grangetown are Hillview to the west, the sea to the east, Hendon and Ashbrooke to the north and Ryhope to the south. Some main roads in Grangetown are Leechmere Road, Ryhope Road, Queen Alexandra Road and Sea View Road. Sea View Road is a very affluent road in Grangetown and has large houses on the main road and semi-detached houses, detached houses and bungalows on the culs de sacs off it. Sea View Road is home to Sea View House a large family home.

City of Sunderland suburbs
Populated coastal places in Tyne and Wear
Sunderland